Rip, Rig and Panic is a 1965 jazz album by saxophonist Roland Kirk. It features a quartet of Kirk, Jaki Byard (piano), Richard Davis (bass), and Elvin Jones (drums); they were described as "the most awesome rhythm section he ever recorded with". The session was held at Rudy Van Gelder's Englewood Cliffs studio. The set is made up primarily of original Kirk compositions.

The title of the album was explained by Kirk in the liner notes as follows: "Rip means Rip Van Winkle (or Rest in Peace?); it's the way people, even musicians are. They're asleep. Rig means like rigor mortis. That's where a lot of peoples mind are. When they hear me doing things they didn't think I could do they panic in their minds". Kirk made many references to pioneers of jazz. "No Tonic Pres" refers to Lester Young; "From Bechet, Byas, and Fats" is a homage to Sidney Bechet, Don Byas, and Fats Waller; and "Once in a While" was inspired by Clifford Brown. Kirk also mentioned the work of Edgar Varèse, the compositions Poeme electronique and Ionisation, as inspiration for the album.

The album's title inspired the name for 1980s English post-punk group Rip Rig + Panic.

Reception
Richard Cook and Brian Morton rated the Emarcy edition of the album, combined with the album Now Please Don't You Cry, Beautiful Edith, with the second-highest grade in their Penguin Guide to Jazz, and named the combined reissue as part of their suggested “core collection” of essential recordings; AllMusic awarded the album five stars.

Track listing
All compositions by Roland Kirk except where indicated.
 "No Tonic Pres" – 4:34
 "Once in a While" (Michael Edwards, Bud Green) – 4:02
 "From Bechet, Byas, and Fats" – 6:31
 "Mystical Dream" – 2:39
 "Rip, Rig & Panic" – 7:00
 "Black Diamond" (Milt Sealey) –  5:23
 "Slippery, Hippery, Flippery" – 4:56
Recorded at Van Gelder Studio, Englewood Cliffs, NJ on January 13, 1965

Personnel
 Roland Kirk: tenor saxophone, stritch, manzello, flute, siren, oboe, castanets
 Jaki Byard: piano
 Richard Davis: bass
 Elvin Jones: drums

References

1965 albums
Rahsaan Roland Kirk albums
Limelight Records albums
Albums recorded at Van Gelder Studio